Richard H.  Thaler (born September 12, 1945) is an American economist and the Charles R. Walgreen Distinguished Service Professor of Behavioral Science and Economics at the University of Chicago Booth School of Business. In 2015, Thaler was president of the American Economic Association.

Thaler is a theorist in behavioral economics who has collaborated with Daniel Kahneman, Amos Tversky, and others in further defining that field. In 2018, he was elected a member in the National Academy of Sciences.

In 2017, he was awarded the Nobel Memorial Prize in Economic Sciences for his contributions to behavioral economics. In its Nobel prize announcement, the Royal Swedish Academy of Sciences stated that his "contributions have built a bridge between the economic and psychological analyses of individual decision-making. His empirical findings and theoretical insights have been instrumental in creating the new and rapidly expanding field of behavioral economics."

Personal life
Thaler was born in East Orange, New Jersey to a Jewish family. His mother, Roslyn (Melnikoff, 1921–2008), was a teacher, and later a real estate agent while his father, Alan Maurice Thaler (1917–2004), was an actuary at the Prudential Financial in Newark, New Jersey, and was born in Toronto. He grew up with two younger brothers. His great-great-grandfather, Selig Thaler (1831–1903) was from Berezhany, Ukraine. He has three children from his first marriage and is now married to France Leclerc, a former marketing professor at the University of Chicago and avid photographer.

Education 
Thaler graduated from Newark Academy, before going on to receive his B.A. degree in 1967 from Case Western Reserve University, and his M.A. in 1970 and Ph.D. degree in 1974 from the University of Rochester, writing his thesis on  "The Value of Saving A Life: A Market Estimate" under the supervision of Sherwin Rosen. He also studied under departmental chair and neoclassicist Richard Rosett, whose wine-buying habits were featured in his research on behavioral economics.

Academic career 
After completing his studies, Thaler began his career as a professor at the University of Rochester.

Between 1977 and 1978, Thaler spent a year at Stanford University collaborating and researching with Daniel Kahneman and Amos Tversky, who provided him with the theoretical framework to fit many of the economic anomalies that he had identified, such as the endowment effect.

From 1978 to 1995, he was a faculty member at the SC Johnson College of Business at Cornell University.

After gathering some attention with a regular column in the respected Journal of Economic Perspectives (which ran between 1987 and 1990) and the publication of these columns by Princeton University Press (in 1992), Thaler was offered a position at the University of Chicago's Booth School of Business in 1995, where he has taught ever since.

Writings

Books 
Thaler has written a number of books intended for a lay reader on the subject of behavioral economics, including Quasi-rational Economics and The Winner's Curse, the latter of which contains many of his Anomalies columns revised and adapted for a popular audience.  One of his recurring themes is that market-based approaches are incomplete: he is quoted as saying, "conventional economics assumes that people are highly-rational—super-rational—and unemotional.  They can calculate like a computer and have no self-control problems."

Thaler is coauthor, with Cass Sunstein, of Nudge: Improving Decisions About Health, Wealth, and Happiness (Yale University Press, 2008). Nudge discusses how public and private organizations can help people make better choices in their daily lives. "People often make poor choices—and look back at them with bafflement!" Thaler and Sunstein write. "We do this because, as human beings, we all are susceptible to a wide array of routine biases that can lead to an equally wide array of embarrassing blunders in education, personal finance, health care, mortgages and credit cards, happiness, and even the planet itself." Thaler and his co-author coined the term "choice architecture."

Thaler advocates for libertarian paternalism, which describes public and private social policies that lead people to make good and better decisions through "nudges" without depriving them of the freedom to choose or significantly changing their economic incentives. An example of this can be seen in Nudge through defaults in organ donation. In the United States, citizens must opt in to donate their organs, while in Australia, citizens must opt out if they do not wish to donate. Consequently, Australia has much higher rates of organ donation than does the United States.

In 2015 Thaler wrote Misbehaving: The Making of Behavioral Economics, a history of the development of behavioral economics, "part memoir, part attack on a breed of economist who dominated the academy—particularly, the Chicago School that dominated economic theory at the University of Chicago—for the much of the latter part of the 20th century."

Other writings 
Thaler gained some attention in the field of mainstream economics for publishing a regular column in the Journal of Economic Perspectives from 1987 to 1990 titled Anomalies, in which he documented individual instances of economic behavior that seemed to violate traditional microeconomic theory.

In a 2008 paper, Thaler and colleagues analyzed the choices of contestants appearing in the popular TV game show Deal or No Deal and found support for behavioralists' claims of path-dependent risk attitudes. He has also studied cooperation and bargaining in the UK game shows Golden Balls and Divided.

As a columnist for The New York Times News Service, Thaler has begun a series of economic solutions for some of America's financial woes, beginning with "Selling parts of the radio spectrum could help pare US deficit," with references to Thomas Hazlett's ideas for reform of the U.S. Federal Communications Commission (FCC) and making television broadcast frequency available for improving wireless technology, reducing costs, and generating revenue for the US government.

Nobel Prize 

Thaler was the 2017 recipient of the Nobel Memorial Prize in Economics for "incorporat[ing] psychologically realistic assumptions into analyses of economic decision-making. By exploring the consequences of limited rationality, social preferences, and lack of self-control, he has shown how these human traits systematically affect individual decisions as well as market outcomes."

Immediately following the announcement of the 2017 prize, Professor Peter Gärdenfors, Member of the Economic Sciences Prize Committee, said in an interview that Thaler had "made economics more human".

After learning that he had won the Nobel Prize, Thaler said that his most important contribution to economics "was the recognition that economic agents are human, and that economic models have to incorporate that." In a nod to the sometimes-unreasonable behavior he has studied so extensively, he also joked that he intended to spend the prize money "as irrationally as possible."

Paul Krugman, the 2008 winner of the Nobel Memorial Prize in Economics, tweeted "Yes! Behavorial econ is the best thing to happen to the field in generations, and Thaler showed the way." However, Thaler's selection was not met with universal acclaim; Robert Shiller (one of the 2013 laureates and a fellow behavioral economist) noted that some economists still view Thaler's incorporation of a psychological perspective within an economics framework as a dubious proposition. In addition, an article in The Economist simultaneously praised Thaler and his fellow behavioral colleagues while bemoaning the practical difficulties that have resulted from causing "economists as a whole to back away a bit from grand theorising, and to focus more on empirical work and specific policy questions."

In chronicling Thaler's path to Nobel laureate, John Cassidy notes that although Thaler's "nudge" theory may not overcome every shortcoming of traditional economics, it has at least grappled with them "in ways that have yielded important insights in areas ranging from finance to international development".

Other honors and awards

In addition to earning the Nobel Memorial Prize in Economic Sciences, Thaler holds many other honors and awards. He is a member of the National Academy of Science, the American Academy of Arts and Sciences, a Fellow of the American Finance Association, and more.

Behavioral finance and other applications in policy 
Thaler also is the founder of an asset management firm, Fuller & Thaler Asset Management, which believes that investors will capitalize on cognitive biases such as the endowment effect, loss aversion and status quo bias. Since 1999, he has been the Principal of the firm, which he co-founded in 1993. Russell Fuller, in charge of the firm's daily operations, said Thaler has changed the economics profession in that "[h]e doesn't write papers that are full of math. He writes papers that are full of common sense."

Since 1991, Thaler has also served as the co-director of the National Bureau of Economic Research Behavioral Economics Project.

Thaler was also involved in the establishment of the Behavioural Insights Team, which was originally part of the British Government's Cabinet Office but is now a limited company.

Thaler made a cameo appearance as himself in the 2015 movie The Big Short, which was about the credit and housing bubble collapse that led to the 2008 global financial crisis. During one of the film's expository scenes, he helped pop star Selena Gomez explain the 'hot hand fallacy,' in which people believe that whatever is happening now will continue to happen in the future. As a consequence of his appearance in the film, Thaler has an Erdős–Bacon number of 5.

Publications

Books 
 Thaler, Richard H. 1992. The Winner's Curse: Paradoxes and Anomalies of Economic Life. Princeton: Princeton University Press. .
 Thaler, Richard H. 1993. Advances in Behavioral Finance. New York: Russell Sage Foundation. .
 Thaler, Richard H. 1994. Quasi Rational Economics. New York: Russell Sage Foundation. .
 Thaler, Richard H. 2005. Advances in Behavioral Finance, Volume II (Roundtable Series in Behavioral Economics). Princeton: Princeton University Press. .
 Thaler, Richard H., and Cass Sunstein. 2009 (updated edition). Nudge: Improving Decisions About Health, Wealth, and Happiness. New York: Penguin. .
 Thaler, Richard H. 2015. Misbehaving: The Making of Behavioral Economics. New York: W. W. Norton & Company. .

Published papers

Thaler has published over 90 papers in various sources, namely finance, business, and economic journals. Some of his most cited and influential papers are listed below.

Kahneman, D., Knetsch, J.L. and Thaler, R.H., 1991. Anomalies: The Endowment Effect, Loss Aversion, and Status Quo Bias. Journal of Economic Perspectives, 5(1), pp. 193–206.
Benartzi, S. and Thaler, R.H., 1995. Myopic Loss Aversion and the Equity Premium Puzzle. Quarterly Journal of Economics, 110(1), pp. 73–92.
Thaler, R., 1980. Toward a Positive Theory of Consumer Choice. Journal of Economic Behavior & Organization, 1(1), pp. 39–60.
Kahneman, D., Knetsch, J.L. and Thaler, R.H., 1990. Experimental Tests of the Endowment Effect and the Coase Theorem. Journal of Political Economy, 98(6), pp. 1325–1348.
De Bondt, W.F. and Thaler, R., 1985. Does the Stock Market Overreact?. The Journal of Finance, 40(3), pp. 793–805.
Barberis, N. and Thaler, R., 2003. A Survey of Behavioral Finance. Handbook of the Economics of Finance, 1, pp. 1053–1128.
Thaler, R., 1985. Mental Accounting and Consumer Choice. Marketing Science, 4(3), pp. 199–214.

References

External links 
 Curriculum Vitae
 Faculty home page at U of Chicago
 Article: Deal or No Deal
 Nudge web page 
 
 IMDB Profile

  including the Prize Lecture 8 December 2017 From Cashews to Nudges: The Evolution of Behavioral Economics

1945 births
Nobel laureates in Economics
American Nobel laureates
20th-century American economists
21st-century American economists
Behavioral economists
Behavioral finance
Case Western Reserve University alumni
Fellows of the Econometric Society
Living people
MIT Sloan School of Management faculty
Newark Academy alumni
Presidents of the American Economic Association
University of Chicago faculty
University of Chicago Booth School of Business faculty
University of Rochester alumni
Cornell University faculty
People from East Orange, New Jersey
Fellows of the American Academy of Arts and Sciences
Economists from New Jersey
Nudge theory
Jewish American academics